S.C. Snider and George McFeeley Polygonal Barn, also known as the Shearer Barn, was a historic round barn located near Huntington in Huntington County, Indiana. It was built in 1906, and was a 12-sided, two-story frame barn.  It had a sectional, three pitched gambrel roof topped by a cupola. It has been demolished.

It was listed on the National Register of Historic Places in 1992 and delisted in 2012.

References

Former National Register of Historic Places in Indiana
Barns on the National Register of Historic Places in Indiana
Round barns in Indiana
Buildings and structures completed in 1906
Buildings and structures in Huntington County, Indiana
National Register of Historic Places in Huntington County, Indiana
1906 establishments in Indiana